Baibai is one of two Fas languages of Amanab District, Sandaun Province, Papua New Guinea. It is the eponymous language of the spurious Baibai family, which was posited when the Fas language was mistakenly swapped for the Kwomtari language Biaka in published data. It actually has little in common with Kwomtari, but is 40% cognate with Fas. (See Fas languages for details.)

Locations
Baron (2007) lists Baibai-speaking villages as Itomi, Piemi, Baibai, and Yebdibi.

References

Sources
 

Languages of Sandaun Province
Fas languages